Rama Medical College or Rama Medical College, Hospital and Research Centre is a private medical college established in 2008 and located in Kanpur, Uttar Pradesh, India.

Courses offered

External Links 

 Official website

See also 

 Rama Medical College, Hospital and Research Centre (Hapur)
 Rama University

References

Private medical colleges in India
Medical colleges in Uttar Pradesh
Kanpur Nagar district
Educational institutions established in 2008
2008 establishments in Uttar Pradesh